The Billboard Hot 100 is a chart that ranks the best-performing singles of the United States. Its data, published by Billboard magazine and compiled by Nielsen SoundScan, is based collectively on each single's weekly physical as well as airplay. Throughout a year, Billboard will publish an annual list of the 100 most successful songs throughout that year on the Hot 100 chart based on the information. For 2002, the list was published on December 29, calculated with data from December 1, 2001 to November 30, 2002.

There were only nine songs that topped the Hot 100 in 2002, the second lowest number in Billboard history. Eminem's "Lose Yourself" was the longest running #1 of the year, spending 12 weeks at #1 with eight of its weeks in 2002 and another four in 2003. Ashanti's "Foolish" and Nelly's "Dilemma" both spent 10 weeks at #1.

"Lose Yourself" also held the record for the longest rap song to stay at number one; it would eventually be tied with The Black Eyed Peas's "Boom Boom Pow" in 2009 and Wiz Khalifa's "See You Again" in 2015. All three of these songs would keep the record until Lil Nas X's "Old Town Road" broke it by spending 19 weeks at #1 in 2019.

Nickelback's "How You Remind Me", which spent 4 weeks at #1 between 2001 and 2002, ended up topping the year-end list.

See also
2002 in music
List of Billboard Hot 100 number-one singles of 2002
List of Billboard Hot 100 top-ten singles in 2002

References

2002 record charts
Billboard charts

nl:Nummer 1-hits in de Billboard Hot 100 in 2002
sv:Billboardlistans förstaplaceringar 2002